Alboran Island is a small islet of Spain (province of Almería) in the Alboran Sea, part of the western Mediterranean Sea, about  north of the Moroccan coast and  from the Spanish mainland. The main buildings are an automated lighthouse built in the 19th century, a small cemetery, and a harbor.

Description

Natural history
Alboran has a volcanic origin, located in an important seismic zone where the African plate collides with the Eurasian plate. In 1899 a new igneous rock was discovered on Alboran, with the name of alboranite, in honor of the island.

The islet has been recognised as an Important Bird Area (IBA) by BirdLife International because it supports a breeding population of Audouin's gulls, as well as various species of passerines on migration.

The wall-rocket species Diplotaxis siettiana, called jaramago de Alborán in Spanish, has its only known wild population on the island. It was extinct there during much of the late 20th century but successfully reintroduced from ex-situ conservation stocks in 1999.

In 2001, the United Nations declared the island and its seabed a Specially Protected Areas of Mediterranean Importance.

History
The island became a power base of Mustafa ben Yusuf al Mahmud ed Din, a Tunisian corsair in the Ottoman sultan's service whose attacks were so ferocious that he became known as Al-Borani (hence the island's name), from the Turkish for "thunderstorm". It became a Spanish possession after the Battle of Alboran in 1540.

Alborán has been known in error as "Albusama".

The aristocrat Archduke Ludwig Salvator of Austria visited the island and published in Prague an illustrated book in German: Alboran (1898).

Early in World War II, the shape of the flat island with a single building prompted a British bomber crew operating at dusk to bomb the island, mistaking it for a U-boat.

In the mid-1960s there were several attempts by Soviet fishing boats to establish a settlement on Alboran, which forced the Spanish army to establish a permanent detachment of Spanish Navy Marines for the control and protection of the island.

It is now home to a small Spanish Navy garrison and an automated lighthouse.

Administration 
The island has belonged to the municipality of Almería since the 19th century.

References
Citations

Bibliography
 

Almería
Islands of Africa
Islands of Spain
Mediterranean islands
Volcanoes of Africa
Volcanoes of Spain
Pre-Holocene volcanoes
Landforms of Andalusia
Important Bird Areas of Spain
Seabird colonies
Important Bird Areas of Mediterranean islands